Olga Krishtop (born 8 October 1957) is a race walker who represented the Soviet Union and later Russia.

Achievements

External links
 

1957 births
Living people
Russian female racewalkers
Soviet female racewalkers
World record setters in athletics (track and field)
World Athletics Race Walking Team Championships winners
World Athletics Indoor Championships winners